Cláudionor Provenzano (9 May 1893 – 2 February 1965) was a Brazilian rower. He competed in the men's eight event at the 1932 Summer Olympics.

References

1893 births
1965 deaths
Brazilian male rowers
Olympic rowers of Brazil
Rowers at the 1932 Summer Olympics
Rowers from Rio de Janeiro (city)